Eráti District is a district of Nampula Province in north-eastern  Mozambique. The principal town is Eráti.

Further reading
District profile (PDF) 

Districts in Nampula Province